The 2020 Bahrain McLaren Pro Cycling season is the fourth season of the  team.

Team roster

Riders who joined the team for the 2020 season

Riders who left the team during or after the 2019 season

Season victories

National, Continental and World champions 2020

Footnotes

References

External links
 

2020 road cycling season by team
Team Bahrain Victorious
2020 in Bahraini sport